Ansley Hoover Truitt Jr. (August 24, 1950 – February 13, 2021) was an American professional basketball player for the Dallas Chaparrals in the American Basketball Association (ABA).

Life and career
He played one season with the Chaparrals from 1972 through 1973. Truitt played college basketball for the California Golden Bears, where he was a first-team all-conference selection in the Pac-8 (known now as the Pac-12) in 1972. He was drafted in the 1972 NBA draft in the third round with the 41st overall pick by the New York Knicks.

Truitt died from COVID-19 on February 13, 2021, at the age of 70. He is survived by his wife, Mary and three daughters, Najah, Nikita and Alanna.

References

External links
 

1950 births
2021 deaths
American expatriate basketball people in France
American expatriate basketball people in the Philippines
American men's basketball players
Basketball players from Georgia (U.S. state)
Basketball players from San Francisco
California Golden Bears men's basketball players
Centers (basketball)
Crispa Redmanizers players
Dallas Chaparrals players
Deaths from the COVID-19 pandemic in Nevada
New York Knicks draft picks
People from West Point, Georgia
Philippine Basketball Association imports
Place of death missing